Blue Mound Township is a township in Livingston County, in the U.S. state of Missouri.

Blue Mound Township was established in 1843, and named for a summit within its borders which appears blue when viewed from afar.

References

Townships in Missouri
Townships in Livingston County, Missouri